Diego Arzú García-Granados (born 1973) is a Guatemalan politician and businessman. Arzú is the secondborn of the former President of Guatemala and mayor of Guatemala City Álvaro Arzú Irigoyen. Diego Arzú served from 2016 to 2020 as deputy to the Central American Parliament.

His possible connection with the assassination of Monsignor Juan Gerardi was investigated by the Public Ministry of Guatemala, however it was not possible to prove the hypothesis.

References

1973 births
People from Guatemala City
Living people
Arzú family
Unionist Party (Guatemala) politicians